Tiptoe is a small Hamlet in the New Forest National Park in Hampshire. It lies mostly within the civil parish of Hordle and partly within the civil parish of Sway.

The Hamlet
Tiptoe has just under 100 residents. It has two churches, and a primary school with an associated pre-school. The parish church is dedicated to Saint Andrew and is the daughter church of All Saints’ at Hordle. The Tiptoe Stores and Post Office closed in 2008, despite a campaign to save it. Just outside the village lies the Plough Inn, the premises of which date from about 1630.

History
The name of the Hamlet derives from a surname of French origin recorded in the 13th century as "Typetot". A member of the "Tibetot" family is known to have held land in the Barton area in the early 14th century.

The Hamlet achieved some notoriety in the 1880s when Mary Ann Girling and her religious sect of New Forest Shakers erected tents at a farm at Tiptoe in 1879, having been evicted from their previous residence at Forest Lodge at Hordle. Girling believed that Second Coming of Christ would soon happen and that she would live forever. Girling died at the Tiptoe farm on 18 September 1886.

A school was built at Tiptoe at the beginning of the 20th century as a replacement for an earlier school in nearby Wootton which burned down in 1914.

St Andrew's Hall on Sway Road, Tiptoe, is a corrugated iron building dating from around 1870. It was initially a chapel at Netley Hospital. It was brought to Tiptoe as a chapel of ease for Hordle Parish Church and is now used as a hall.

References

Villages in Hampshire